The Canton Memorial Civic Center is a multi-purpose arena located in Canton, Ohio, United States.

Built in 1951, previous sports teams that have played at the center include the Canton Legends indoor football team, Canton Invaders indoor soccer team, Ohio Aviators of the American Basketball Association, and the Canton Charge of the NBA G League. The building is owned by the City of Canton and operated by ASM Global.  Capacity is 5,200 in the arena, and up to 600 in the McKinley Room.

The facility has over the years hosted concerts, professional wrestling cards, political rallies, family shows, and features a number of annual Pro Football Hall of Fame festival events, the arena played host to Superstars on September 9, 1995 and Raw's New Fall Season Premiere on September 11, 1995 following that Superstars on September 16, 1995,

References

External links
 

1951 establishments in Ohio
Basketball venues in Ohio
Buildings and structures in Canton, Ohio
Canton Charge
Indoor soccer venues in Ohio
NBA G League venues
Sports venues completed in 1951
Tourist attractions in Canton, Ohio
Indoor arenas in Ohio